Simon Over attended King Henry VIII School in Coventry, UK. He subsequently studied at the Conservatorium van Amsterdam, the Royal Academy of Music and the University of Oxford (at Keble College).

From 1992 to 2002, Over was a member of the music staff of Westminster Abbey, and Director of Music at both St Margaret's Church and the Chapel of St Mary Undercroft in the Palace of Westminster. He is the Founder-Conductor of the UK Parliament Choir and has conducted all the choir's performances in conjunction with the City of London Sinfonia, La Serenissima, The London Festival Orchestra and Southbank Sinfonia.

Over has been Music Director of Southbank Sinfonia since its formation in 2002 and has conducted many of its concerts throughout the UK and Europe in concert halls as diverse as St George's Chapel, Windsor Castle; St James's Palace; The Royal Opera House, Covent Garden; Westminster Abbey; a beer tent in Bury St Edmunds and a converted cowshed in Aberdeenshire. He has conducted Southbank Sinfonia in recordings with cellist Raphael Wallfisch and tenor Andrew Kennedy and in 2009 and 2010 conducted the orchestra in a total of 71 performances of a new production of Every Good Boy Deserves Favour (Tom Stoppard/André Previn) at the Royal National Theatre which received rave reviews.

In 2006, Over was appointed Conductor of the Malcolm Sargent Festival Choir and has been associated with the Samling Foundation in its work with young professional singers since its inception in 1996. Over is Artistic Director of the Music Festival in Anghiari (Tuscany), where he was recently made an Honorary Citizen.

Further afield, he has conducted the City Chamber Orchestra (Hong Kong) and the Dunedin Symphony Orchestra (New Zealand). He has worked with many internationally acclaimed musicians, including Sir Thomas Allen, Emma Kirkby, Dame Felicity Lott, Alessio Bax, Malcolm Martineau, Emma Johnson, and Sir James and Lady Galway.

As a pianist, his performances with American violinist Miriam Kramer at the Wigmore Hall London and Lincoln Center, New York – as well as on several recordings – have received high critical acclaim.

Discography
BLOCH: Violin Sonatas Nos. 1 and 2 Suite Hebraique with Miriam Kramer

References

External links
Home | Southbank Sinfonia
Conductors | The Parliament Choir
Simon Over- Bio, Albums, Pictures – Naxos Classical Music.
(Southbank Sinfonia at the Anghiari Festival in Tuscany: Simon Over, Music Director

1964 births
Living people
British male conductors (music)
British classical pianists
Male classical pianists
Musicians from Coventry
Alumni of Keble College, Oxford
21st-century British conductors (music)
21st-century classical pianists
21st-century British male musicians